The Sialkot women's cricket team is the women's representative cricket team for Sialkot. They competed in the National Women's Cricket Championship between 2005–06 and 2017.

History
Sialkot joined the National Women's Cricket Championship for its second season in 2005–06, losing all three of their matches in the Lahore Zone. The side competed in every subsequent edition of the National Women's Cricket Championship until it ended in 2017. They qualified for the final of Pool B in 2012–13, but lost to Islamabad. In 2016, they qualified for the final Super League stage, finishing 5th overall.

Players

Notable players
Players who played for Sialkot and played internationally are listed below, in order of first international appearance (given in brackets):

 Nazia Nazir (1997)
 Sadia Butt (1997)
 Uzma Gondal (2000)
 Almas Akram (2008)
 Nida Dar (2010)
 Saba Nazir (2019)

Seasons

National Women's Cricket Championship

Honours
 National Women's Cricket Championship:
 Winners (0):
 Best finish: 5th (2016)

See also
 Sialkot cricket team

References

Women's cricket teams in Pakistan
Cricket in Sialkot